Ten is the second studio album by Australian-born singer-songwriter Gabriella Cilmi, released on 22 March 2010. The lead single, "On a Mission", appeared two weeks ahead of the album and marked Cilmi's foray into more 1980s inspired music. Ten is Cilmi's second and final album released under Island Records.

The album peaked in the top 40 in Australia and the UK. PopJustice placed Ten at number 4 on their "Top 33 albums of 2010" list. The album was not released in the United States.

Background 
According to Cilmi, Ten features "lots of uptempo funk and disco-inspired numbers designed to make people groove" as well as "some more sexy tracks". One song incorporates a type of yodel into it. While producing the album, Cilmi worked with Greg Kurstin, The Invisible Men and Dallas Austin, as well as Xenomania on the song "Hearts Don't Lie" which she likens to a Bee Gees song. Cilmi has said "Love Me 'Cause You Want To" is the song she's most proud of due to the fact it was produced with her band.

The album's cover was released a few weeks after Cilmi was reported as having criticised Lady Gaga for the skimpy nature of her clothing, the cover of Ten, on which Cilmi appears to be wearing an orange brassiere, overlaid with a black snaky design representative of cinematic film, aroused some interest. Shortly afterwards a further portfolio of photographs was published, for which Cilmi had posed in items of red and black lingerie.

Critical reception 

Overall critical reaction has been generally positive. Hugh Montgomery for The Observer called it "Good, plasticky fun", praising 'Love Me Cos You Want To' and 'Hearts Don't Lie' but criticising the "unnecessary excursions into quivering balladry and jaunty piano-pop". Pete Paphides for The Times also awarded 4 stars, saying "If her current single on a Mission doesn't manage to relieve Cilmi of the 2008 Sweet About Me albatross, then the sensuous future-disco of Love Me Cos should do the trick."

Caroline Sullivan for The Guardian gave Ten 3 stars, saying "Her zest and powerful, Anastacia like voice can't be faulted, but the music, produced mainly by dance-pop overlords Greg Kurstin and Dallas Austin, is woefully generic." BBC Music also praised Cilmi's voice, and said about the album: "Ten still doesn't give too a clear indication of where to place Cilmi as an artist. And while that may infuriate chronic pigeonholers, it's also part of Ten's beauty – it may be a mere stepping stone to something more defined in the bigger picture, but there's an unpredictability and a talent on display that implies she knows exactly where she's going." Pierre Oitmann of Dutch news site Nu.nl cites Gabriella Cilmi as being "every record company mogul's wet dream (...) effortlessly adjusting to the musical genre of choice", and giving the album 7 out of 10 stars.

Singles 
The album's lead single, "On a Mission", was released on 5 February 2010 in Australia, and 7 March in the UK. It is accompanied by a £250,000 music video, billed as a homage to Barbarella. The song reached the top 10 on the UK Singles Chart and top 20 on the ARIA Singles Chart, where it was certified Gold. Hearts Don't Lie" was released as the second single, it was released in the UK on 7 June 2010. It performed less successfully, failing to chart in Australia, and reaching a lowly number 134 in the UK. "Defender" was released as the album's third and final single on 30 August 2010 exclusively in the UK, where it failed to appear on the singles chart. Promotional releases of "Defender" issued the single as a double-A Side with its b-side "Magic Carpet Ride", which also appeared as a b-side on "On a Mission" and a bonus track on Ten.

Track listing

Charts

References 

2010 albums
Albums produced by Dallas Austin
Albums produced by Greg Kurstin
Albums produced by Xenomania
Gabriella Cilmi albums
Island Records albums